Raj Begum (27 March 1927 – 26 October 2016) was a Kashmiri singer. She was also known as the Melody Queen of Kashmir. She was honoured with Sangeet Natak Akademi Award and India's fourth highest civilian award the Padma Shri in 2002. Begum was born in Srinagar in 1927 and died in 2016, aged 89.

References

1927 births
2016 deaths
Singers from Jammu and Kashmir
Recipients of the Sangeet Natak Akademi Award
Recipients of the Padma Shri in arts
20th-century Indian women singers
People from Srinagar
Women musicians from Jammu and Kashmir
20th-century Indian singers
21st-century Indian singers
21st-century Indian women singers